Fast & Furious 6 is a racing video game based on the 2013 film. It was released in two different versions, the 2D by Gameloft and the 3D by Kabam for Android, iOS, J2ME, Windows Phone and Windows 8.1.

Gameplay

2D version 
Fast & Furious 6 is Gameloft's second Fast & Furious game after Fast Five the Movie: Official Game. The game is played almost the same as its predecessor and features street races from various parts of the world. New features include the super borrowed boost from  Asphalt 6: Adrenaline  and helicopters that fire rockets into the player's car.

The main mode of the game is the story that follows the same structure as that of "Fast Five". It is made up of seven chapters each with five careers that must be completed to advance to the next chapter. As new cars progress, parts and characters are unlocked. Most of the race modes are the same as in the previous game and include normal races, as well as events involving drifting or eliminating opposing drivers. New modes include Collector, which involves taking enough money, and Wanted where the player has to avoid being arrested by the police.

3D version 
The game is played similarly to CSR Racing, and focuses on endurance racing, but also adds drift. Correctly timing your gears is essential in drag mode, and shifting too soon or too late (speeding) will result in slower times. Drift mode is essentially on-rails as well, relying on the player primarily for timely inputs.

While the game features a paid premium coin, everything can be forced and unlocked through regular play at no cost to the user.

Reception 

Fast & Furious 6 received mixed or average reviews according to the review aggregator Metacritic.

References

External links
 
 

2013 video games
Android (operating system) games
Fast & Furious video games
Gameloft games
IOS games
J2ME games
Java platform games
Kabam games
Mobile games
Multiplayer and single-player video games
Racing video games
Street racing video games
Video games based on films
Video games developed in China
Video games developed in the United States
Video games set in California
Video games set in China
Video games set in England
Video games set in France
Video games set in Hong Kong
Video games set in London
Video games set in Los Angeles
Video games set in Moscow
Video games set in Russia 
Video games set in Spain
Video games set in the United Kingdom
Video games set in the United States
Video games with 2.5D graphics
Windows games
Windows Phone games